Krymbek Eleuuly Kusherbayev (Qyrymbek Eleuūly Köşerbaev; born 20 May 1955) is a Kazakh politician who's serving as the State Secretary of Kazakhstan since 2019. Prior to that, Kusherbayev served as the head of the Presidential Administration, akim of Kyzylorda Region from 2013 to 2019, First Deputy Prime Minister of Kazakhstan from 2012 to 2013, akim of Mangystau Region from 2006 to 2011, Ambassador of Kazakhstan to Russia, Finland and Armenia from 2003 to 2006, akim of West Kazakhstan Region from 2000 to 2003, and the Minister of Education and Science from 1997 to 2000.

Biography

Early life and career 
Kusherbayev was born in the city of Kazalinsk (present-day Kazaly) in the Kyzylorda Region. His father Eleu Kusherbayev was also an eminent politician of the Kyzylorda Region and was the First Secretary of the Communist Party of several districts, such as Karmakshy and Kazaly. His grandfather Kosherbay Daribayev was the Hero of Socialist Labour. In 1978, Kusherbayev graduated from Satbayev University as a specialist in civil engineering. 

After graduating, Kusherbayev was an engineer and the chief of group of preparation of production PMK-112 "Glavrissovkhozstroy" in Kyzylorda. From 1979 to 1988, he held several positions at Komsomol of the Kyzyloda Region and Central Committee of the Komsomol in the Kazakh SSR. 

Kusherbayev attended the Academy of Sciences of the Soviet Union from 1988 to 1991, where he earned specialty in political science. That same year, he served as the assistant of Speechwriting Office on Culture and the International Relations of the Administration of President of Kazakh SSR. 

From 1991 to 1994, Kusherbayev was the assistant of the Deputy Prime Minister of Kazakhstan. In 1994, he became the head of the Kalinin District of Almaty. In 1995, Kusherbayev was appointed as the deputy of the Head of Administration of Department of Internal Policy of the Administration. That same year, he became the deputy of the Administration Head of Department of Territorial Development. From 1996 to 1997, Kusherbayev served as the Press Secretary and the Manager of the Press Service of the President.

Political career 
In October 1997, he was appointed as the Minister of Health, Education and Sports and served that position until the ministry was reorganized into the Ministry of Education and Science where Kusherbayev led until he was became the akim of West Kazakhstan Region on 18 December 2000. In November 2003, he became an ambassador to Russia, along with Finland and Armenia.

On 24 January 2006, Kusherbayev was appointed as the akim of Mangystau Region. Following the Zhanaozen massacre where 14 oil workers in the city square were killed by police on 16 December 2011, during the Independence Day celebration, Kusherbayev stated "Let the journalists see with their own eyes what the criminals have done. They have already crossed the line, blood has been shed, human casualties have appeared. Now they have to answer to the fullest before the law." Shortly after the tragic event, on 22 December 2011, Kusherbayev was dismissed from his post by President Nursultan Nazarbayev and was succeeded by a Senator and Former Minister of Internal Affairs Bauyrzhan Mukhamedzhanov.

On 13 July 2012, he became an adviser to the President of Kazakhstan and served the office until 26 September 2012, when Kusherbayev was appointed as the First Deputy Prime Minister under Akhmetov's government. He was shortly replaced by Bakhytzhan Sagintayev on 16 January 2013. The following day, on 17 January 2013, Kusherbayev was appointed as the akim of Kyzylorda Region.

On 28 June 2019, Kusherbayev was appointed as the head of the Presidential Administration of Kazakhstan by Kassym-Jomart Tokayev. He served that position until he became the State Secretary of Kazakhstan on 18 September 2019. On January 5, 2022, he was relieved of his post as Secretary of State.

In November 2022, Kusherbayev, by decision of the board of "KazMunayGas", was elected a member of the Board of Directors of "Embamunaigas" JSC.

Awards
The Order of "Parasat" (2003)
The Order of "Friendship" (the Russian Federation, 2006)
The Order of "Barys" of ІІ degrees (2009)
The Order of the First President of the Republic of Kazakhstan (2015)

References 

1955 births
Living people
Kazakhstani politicians
Governors of regions of Kazakhstan
Kyzylorda Region
Deputy Prime Ministers of Kazakhstan
First Deputy Prime Ministers of Kazakhstan